Reckless Love may refer to:
 Reckless Love, a Finnish metal band
 Reckless Love (Reckless Love album), 2010
 Reckless Love (Cory Asbury album), 2018
 "Reckless Love (song)", a 2017 single by Cory Asbury
 "Reckless Love", a song by Bleachers from Strange Desire, 2014